Teplice nad Bečvou (until 1959 Zbrašov) is a spa municipality and village in Přerov District in the Olomouc Region of the Czech Republic. It has about 400 inhabitants.

Geography
It lies in the Moravian-Silesian Foothills. It is situated on the left bank of the Bečva River.

History
The first written mention of Teplice nad Bečvou under its old name Zbrašov is from 1328. One half of the village belonged to Helfštýn and later to Hranice estate and one half was owned by the Hradisko Monastery. In 1491, William II of Pernstein bought Zbrašov from Hradisko Monastery and joined it to his Hranice estate.

Zbrašov was then held by Václav Haugvic of Biskupice (in 1547–1553) and by Jan Kropáč Sr. of Nevědomí (1553–1571). In 1553, Jan Kropáč of Nevědomí had the most abundant thermal springs brought to one place and thus laid the foundations of the local spa. After the Battle of White Mountain, Zbrašov was acquired by Franz von Dietrichstein. His house owned the estate until 1923.

Spa
The municipality is known as a spa resort that specializes in cardio-rehabilitation for clients with the emphasis on prevention of heart attacks and strokes. A unique medicinal mean are baths in the alkali earthy acidulous water with a high content of carbon dioxide.

Sights

The Zbrašov Aragonite Caves are located in Teplice nad Bečvou. The cave system was discovered in 1912 and open to the public in 1926. The caves contain aragonite, raft stalagmites and sinter spheric coating, reminding of doughnuts.

Notable people
Olina Hátlová-Tylová (born 1943), luger
Miroslav Janota (born 1948), wrestler
Petr Matoušek (born 1949), cyclist
Jaromír Vlk (born 1949), athlete
Petr Kůrka (born 1960), sports shooter
Dušan Masár (born 1962), wrestler
Radka Štusáková (born 1972), judoka

References

External links

Teplice nad Bečvou Spa

Villages in Přerov District
Spa towns in the Czech Republic